Rajashekhar Harikant (born 4 October 1990) is an Indian cricketer. He made his first-class debut for Goa in the 2018–19 Ranji Trophy on 14 December 2018.

References

External links
 

1990 births
Living people
Indian cricketers
Goa cricketers
Place of birth missing (living people)